Donald Ross Prothero (February 21, 1954) is an American geologist, paleontologist, and author who specializes in mammalian paleontology and magnetostratigraphy, a technique to date rock layers of the Cenozoic era and its use to date the climate changes which occurred 30–40 million years ago. He is the author or editor of more than 30 books and over 300 scientific papers, including at least 5 geology textbooks.

Stephen Jay Gould cited Prothero's research on the lack of response to climate change in mammals from the Eocene, Oligocene and Pleistocene epochs to support the punctuated equilibrium model of evolution. He called Prothero "the best punctuated equilibrium researcher on the West Coast".

Biography

Prothero grew up in the Glendale, California area, the son of Clifford R. Prothero (1920–2004), a technical illustrator for Lockheed, and Shirley M. (McDonald) Prothero (1924–2016), an artist and homemaker. He attended the University of California, Riverside where he studied paleontology under Dr. Michael O. Woodburne and Dr. Michael Murphy and earned Phi Beta Kappa during his junior year. He received his Ph.D. in geological sciences in 1982 from Columbia University, New York.

In 1991, he appeared on the television game show Jeopardy! and defeated Ben Stein on the show Win Ben Stein's Money in 1999. He was also featured in the Mr. Deity and the Flood episode of the video series Mr. Deity. Further, he debated the Young Earth creationist Duane Gish early in his career.

For 27 years, he was a member of the faculty at Occidental College and he previously taught at California Institute of Technology, Knox College, Vassar College and Columbia University where he led many undergraduate paleontological and geological field trips. He is currently a research associate in vertebrate paleontology at the Natural History Museum of Los Angeles County.

Work

Evolution
Prothero was one of the earliest paleontologists to use the concept of palaeomagnetism in the study of continental rocks. Palaeomagnetism uses the microscopic iron within sedimentary rock to read the alignment of the magnetic field and correlate that with the known history of the polarity reversals of the earth's magnetic field. The magnetic reversals are precisely dated and consistent worldwide which allows these rocks to be studied in climate science and evolution.

In addition to his research in magnetostratigraphy, another area of Prothero's research is the evolution of hoofed mammals, especially rhinos, camels, peccaries, and horses.

Prothero's work on documenting evolutionary history of fossil vertebrates was cited by Richard Dawkins in his book The Greatest Show on Earth: the Evidence of Evolution. Skeptic Society founder Michael Shermer called Prothero's 2007 book, Evolution: What the Fossils Say And Why It Matters,  "the best book ever produced on the subject."

He has also been featured as a scientific consultant and was interviewed on several television documentaries, including the Are Rhinos Dinos? episode of TLC's Paleoworld, the History Channel's Prehistoric Monsters Revealed, the episodes of National Geographic's Prehistoric Predators covering the entelodon and hyaenodon, the series Walking with Prehistoric Beasts on BBC, and the amphicyon or Bear Dog episode of Monsters Resurrected.

In October 2012, Prothero appeared in his capacity as a paleontologist on Conspiracy Road Trip, a BBC television documentary in which five individuals who self-identified as Creationists participated in a road trip along the western coast of the United States, meeting with various experts on the topic, exchanging views and questions with people holding differing views.

Cryptozoology
Prothero has frequently written about the topic of cryptozoology, a pseudoscience and subculture, which he categorizes along with Holocaust denial and UFO abductions claims as aspects of American culture that are "clearly baloney".

Prothero's 2013 book with Daniel Loxton, Abominable Science: The Origin of Yeti, Nessie, and Other Cryptids discusses the subculture in depth. In a review by Adrienne Mayor of Stanford University, she describes the book as "An entertaining, educational, passionate, and valuable handbook for readers interested getting a scientific perspective on the field of cryptozoology. With marvelous artwork and deeply researched histories of the various creatures, this is an impressive and authoritative book."

Anthropogenic global warming 
Prothero looks at the evidence regarding global warming and the role humans have had on it. In his book Greenhouse of the Dinosaurs, Prothero states "geologists and paleoclimatologists know a lot about past greenhouse worlds, and the icehouse planet that has existed for the past 33 million years. We have a good understanding of how and why the Antarctic ice sheet first appeared at that time, and how the Arctic froze over about 3.5 million years ago, beginning the 24 glacial and interglacial episodes of the 'Ice Ages' that have occurred since then." In his article in eSkeptic, Prothero details carbon dioxide increases, melting polar icecaps, melting glaciers and sea level rise as some of the more important areas that point to anthropogenic global warming. He also goes into details to outline climate change deniers' arguments and rebuttals to those arguments and finally talks about why people deny climate change.

Skepticism
Prothero grew up in a Presbyterian household, but eventually became an atheist. He became involved in the skeptical movement in the mid-1990s, when Michael Shermer invited him to join the editorial board of The Skeptics Society. His first appearance as a panelist at The Amazing Meeting was in 2010.

As a result of Prothero's books about evolution in 2007 and climate change in 2009, he recognized that "those same people who were denying evolution are often the exact same people who deny climate [change]."  This realization led him to research and author "Reality Check: How Science Deniers Threaten Our Future" in 2013 as he explained during an interview on the podcast Skepticality:

In 2015, Prothero was elected a fellow of the Committee for Skeptical Inquiry.

Selected publications
 Vertebrate Evolution: From Origins to Dinosaurs and Beyond, CRC Press, 2022,
 When Humans Nearly Vanished: The Catastrophic Explosion of the Toba Volcano, Smithsonian, 2018, 
 Rhinoceros Giants: The Paleobiology of Indricotheres, Indiana University Press, Bloomington, Indiana, 2013, 
 Abominable Science: The Origin of Yeti, Nessie, and Other Cryptids, with Daniel Loxton, Columbia Univ. Press, New York, 2013, 
 Reality Check: How Science Deniers Threaten our Future, Indiana University Press, Bloomington, Indiana, 2013, 
 Catastrophes!: Earthquakes, Tsunamis, Tornadoes, and Other Earth-Shattering Disasters, The Johns Hopkins University Press, 2011, 
 Greenhouse of the Dinosaurs: Evolution, Extinction, and the Future of Our Planet, Columbia University Press, New York, 2009 
 Evolution: What the Fossils Say And Why It Matters, Columbia University Press, New York, 2007, 
 After the Dinosaurs: The Age of Mammals, Indiana University Press, Bloomington, Indiana, 2006, 
 The Eocene-Oligocene Transition: Paradise Lost, Columbia University Press, New York, 1993,

Textbooks
 Evolution of the Earth, McGraw-Hill, 2003, 
 Bringing Fossils To Life: An Introduction To Paleobiology, McGraw-Hill Science/Engineering/Math, 2003, 
 Sedimentary Geology, W.H. Freeman, 
 Interpreting the Stratigraphic Record, W.H. Freeman & Co., New York, 1990, 
 Earth: Portrait of a Planet (first edition), W.W. Norton & Company, New York, 2001,

Boards

Prothero is on the editorial board of Skeptic magazine, and in the past has served as an associate or technical editor for such scientific journals as Geology, Paleobiology, and Journal of Paleontology. His fellowships include the Geological Society of America, the Paleontological Society, the Linnean Society of London (1987), the Guggenheim Foundation (1988), the Committee for Skeptical Inquiry, and the National Science Foundation.

He served as the president and vice president of the Pacific Section of Society for Sedimentary Geology, and five years as the program chair for the Society of Vertebrate Paleontology.  He has also been a member of Society for the Study of Mammalian Evolution since 2005.

Critical reception
Prothero's 2005 work The Evolution of North American Rhinoceroses received critical attention in the Journal of Paleontology, where Professor David Froehlich lauded the book's comprehensive coverage of North American rhinoceros species, but noted that the work would be less likely to appeal to nonspecialists, for whom the "bulk of the book" is likely to be "more than most would like to know about North American rhinos." However, Froehlich wrote that for those "who need this kind of detail, this book is virtually unmatched and indispensable," noting that his "one real quibble" was the "lack of an overall discussion of rhinoceros evolution" that was geographically comprehensive, which Froehlich thought would "put these organisms in a global context for the nonspecialist."

A May 2009 Reports of the National Center for Science Education review of Prothero's Evolution: What the Fossils Say and Why it Matters described Prothero as "equal to his task" of providing resources for evaluating the fossil record, and praised the book's breadth of coverage of its topic. Although the reviewer criticized Prothero's treatment of creationist claims for the book's "polemical tone" and "contempt" for religion-based opponents of the biological sciences, he also noted that Prothero "is well versed in the history of science and religion and makes it clear that he sees no necessary conflict between science and religion."

In a review of Prothero's 2011 book Catastrophes!: Earthquakes, Tsunamis, Tornadoes, and Other Earth-Shattering Disasters for the American Library Association, Prothero is described as "seiz[ing] teaching opportunities" to explain the methods involved with taking metrics of the types of disasters discussed. While the reviewer praised Prothero for his approach to these topics and "recommended" the work, Prothero's "presentation becomes more complex" as the book discusses ice ages and global warming according to the reviewer, who states that "with all scientists convinced that warming is occurring as a result of human action, [...] he disparages the denialists."

Awards and honors
Prothero has received a number of honors for his research as well as his lectures and books. In 1991, he received the Charles Schuchert Award of the Paleontological Society for the outstanding paleontologist under the age of 40. His book Evolution: What the Fossils Say and Why it Matters received the 2007 PSP award for excellence in earth science from the Association of American Publishers.

In 2013 he received the Diamond Award for Distinguished Achievement in Science and Technology from the Glendale Unified School District. The National Association of Geoscience Teachers selected him for the 2013 James Shea Award.
His lectures on topics like evolution, fossil mammals and climate change have been featured at the Skeptic Society Lecture Series and at The Amaz!ng Meeting as well as the Paleontological Society where he was named a Distinguished Speaker in 1993–1994.

Prothero was awarded the 2015 Joseph T Gregory Service Award honoring his outstanding service to the welfare of the Society of Vertebrate Paleontology. In 2016 he was awarded the Friend of Darwin award from the National Center for Science Education, with NCSE's executive director Ann Reid saying "it would be hard to think of anyone who has contributed as much to the public understanding of the paleontological evidence for evolution and against creationism as Don Prothero." He was also named a fellow of the Committee for Skeptical Inquiry citing his "distinguished contributions to science and skepticism."

The Committee for Skeptical Inquiry (CSI) awarded  Tim Callahan and Prothero the Robert P. Balles Annual Prize in Critical Thinking for their book UFOs, Chemtrails, and Aliens. CSI stated this book "not only refute(s) false claims and misguided beliefs ... but more importantly they also arm readers with the tools they will need to fairly evaluate any extraordinary claim they come across". The $2,500 prize will be awarded at the CSICon conference in Las Vegas, October 2018.

References

External links

 
 http://www.skepticblog.org SkepticBlog.org

1954 births
American paleontologists
American science writers
American skeptics
American atheists
Columbia University faculty
Occidental College faculty
California Institute of Technology faculty
Vassar College faculty
Columbia University alumni
Writers from Glendale, California
Fellows of the Linnean Society of London
American geologists
Critics of creationism
Critics of cryptozoology
Living people
Punctuated equilibrium
Jeopardy! contestants
Fellows of the Geological Society of America
Former Presbyterians